Donald Kemp Ross (June 29, 1943May 14, 2022) was an American public interest lawyer. Ross proposed the model of Public Interest Research Groups (PIRGS) with Ralph Nader. Ross became the first director of the  NYPIRG (The New York Public Interest Research Group, Inc.). 
He helped to found the Albany law firm of Malkin & Ross, and its associated advocacy organization M+R Strategic Services. He has served on the board of directors of environmental organizations.

Early life and education
Ross was the son of Helen (Kemp), a homemaker, and Hugh Ross, an administrator for the Conservation Foundation. Ross graduated with a BA in English from Fordham University, where he was student body president, in 1965.

He served in the Peace Corps in Nigeria from 1965 to 1967.

He graduated New York University Law School in 1970.

Public Interest Research Groups (PIRGS)
While serving with Ralph Nader, Donald K. Ross wrote the book Action for a change, which proposed the organizational model for Public Interest Research Groups (PIRGS). He was the first director of the New York Public Interest Research Group, Inc. (NYPIRG). While at NYPIRG, Ross helped it grow to become the largest state-based research and advocacy organization in the nation. Ross was NYPIRG's principal strategist, lobbyist and fundraiser.

Law career
In 1984, he and Arthur Malkin founded the law firm Malkin & Ross, which is based in Albany, New York. Malkin and Ross later formed M+R Strategic Services, which is based in Washington, D.C. He worked as an attorney for Ralph Nader.

Citizen Action Group
The Citizen Action Group (CAG) was the organizing arm of Public Citizen. Ross worked as CAG's head, and helped create the Parents Action Committee on Toys (PACT), the Connecticut Citizen Action Group (CCAG) as well as Public Interest Research Groups in 15 different states.

Board member of environmental organizations
He has served as an adviser and officer of several non-profit organizations that are dedicated to public-interest causes, especially the environment. He served as the chief administrative officer of the Rockefeller Family fund from 1985 to 1999. In 2011, he was on the Boards of Directors for the League of Conservation Voters; that same year, he served as the chairperson of Greenpeace US.

Other activities
Ross worked as a consultant for the Long Island Veatch Program, the Center for Research on Institutions and Social Policy, and the New York Community Trust.

He was one of the chief coordinators for the 1979 March on Washington and the No Nukes Rally in Battery Park City.

Personal life
Ross was married to writer Helen Klein Ross until his death from lymphoma in Salisbury, Connecticut, on May 14, 2022. He was 78.

Books
He is the author and co-author of many books, including A Public Citizen's Action Manual, Troubled Waters: Toxic Chemicals in the Hudson River, and Action for Change: A Manual of Public Interest Organizing.''

Notes

External links
Ross, Donald K. (WorldCat Identities)

1943 births
2022 deaths
New York Public Interest Research Group
New York (state) lawyers
American democracy activists
American environmentalists
American non-fiction environmental writers
American political writers
American male non-fiction writers
Consumer rights activists
Peace Corps volunteers